Prismen (literally "The Crystal") is a multifunctional sports and cultural venue in Holmbladsgade on Amager in Copenhagen, Denmark. It was inaugurated in 2006 to a design by Dorte Mandrup.

Design
An appendage  to the surrounding buildings, it has a characteristic angled form and a translucent  skin of polycarbonate panels which contrasts the bricks of the surrounding buildings, let daylight into the building in the daytime and makes it glow at night.

Facilities
The building has an area of 3,340 square metres and contain a large venue, a dance studio, a hall for cultural activities, four smaller rooms and a large balcony on the first floor. Other facilities include changing rooms, office space for staff and an organic café.

References

External links
 Official website
 Images on arkitekturbilleder.dk

Amager
Sports venues in Copenhagen
Buildings and structures completed in 2006